József Tarányi (1 January 1912 – 21 February 1964) was a Hungarian wrestler. He competed in two events at the 1948 Summer Olympics.

References

External links
 

1912 births
1964 deaths
Hungarian male sport wrestlers
Olympic wrestlers of Hungary
Wrestlers at the 1948 Summer Olympics
Martial artists from Budapest
20th-century Hungarian people